The coconut tree (Cocos nucifera) is a member of the palm tree family (Arecaceae) and the only living species of the genus Cocos. The term "coconut" (or the archaic "cocoanut") can refer to the whole coconut palm, the seed, or the fruit, which botanically is a drupe, not a nut. The name comes from the old Portuguese word coco, meaning "head" or "skull", after the three indentations on the coconut shell that resemble facial features. They are ubiquitous in coastal tropical regions and are a cultural icon of the tropics.

The coconut tree provides food, fuel, cosmetics, folk medicine and building materials, among many other uses. The inner flesh of the mature seed, as well as the coconut milk extracted from it, form a regular part of the diets of many people in the tropics and subtropics. Coconuts are distinct from other fruits because their endosperm contains a large quantity of clear liquid, called coconut water or coconut juice. Mature, ripe coconuts can be used as edible seeds, or processed for oil and plant milk from the flesh, charcoal from the hard shell, and coir from the fibrous husk. Dried coconut flesh is called copra, and the oil and milk derived from it are commonly used in cookingfrying in particularas well as in soaps and cosmetics. Sweet coconut sap can be made into drinks or fermented into palm wine or coconut vinegar. The hard shells, fibrous husks and long pinnate leaves can be used as material to make a variety of products for furnishing and decoration.

The coconut has cultural and religious significance in certain societies, particularly in the Western Pacific Austronesian cultures where it features in their mythologies, songs, and oral traditions. It also had ceremonial importance in pre-colonial animistic religions. It has also acquired religious significance in South Asian cultures, where it is used in Hindu rituals. It forms the basis of wedding and worship rituals in Hinduism. It also plays a central role in the Coconut Religion of Vietnam. The falling of their mature fruit has led to preoccupation with death by coconut.

Coconuts were first domesticated by the Austronesian peoples in Island Southeast Asia and were spread during the Neolithic via their seaborne migrations as far east as the Pacific Islands, and as far west as Madagascar and the Comoros. They played a critical role in the long sea voyages of Austronesians by providing a portable source of food and water, as well as providing building materials for Austronesian outrigger boats. Coconuts were also later spread in historic times along the coasts of the Indian and Atlantic Oceans by South Asian, Arab, and European sailors. Based on these separate introductions, coconut populations can still be divided into Pacific coconuts and Indo-Atlantic coconuts, respectively. Coconuts were introduced by Europeans to the Americas only during the colonial era in the Columbian exchange, but there is evidence of a possible pre-Columbian introduction of Pacific coconuts to Panama by Austronesian sailors. The evolutionary origin of the coconut is under dispute, with theories stating that it may have evolved in Asia, South America, or on Pacific islands. Plants are intolerant of cold weather and prefer copious precipitation, as well as full sunlight. Many insect pests and diseases affect the species and are a nuisance for commercial production. About 75% of the world's supply of coconuts is produced by Indonesia, the Philippines, and India. The coconut tree is the official state tree of Kerala, India.

Description 

On fertile soil, a tall coconut palm tree can yield up to 75 fruits per year, but more often yields less than 30. Given proper care and growing conditions, coconut palms produce their first fruit in six to ten years, taking 15 to 20 years to reach peak production.

True-to-type dwarf varieties of Pacific coconuts have been cultivated by the Austronesian peoples since ancient times. These varieties were selected for slower growth, sweeter coconut water, and often brightly-colored fruits. Many modern different varieties are also grown, including the Maypan coconut, King coconut, and Macapuno. These vary by the taste of the coconut water and color of the fruit, as well as other genetic factors.

Fruit

Botanically, the coconut fruit is a drupe, not a true nut. Like other fruits, it has three layers: the exocarp, mesocarp, and endocarp. The exocarp is the glossy outer skin, usually yellow-green to yellow-brown in color. The mesocarp is composed of a fiber, called coir, which has many traditional and commercial uses. Both the exocarp and the mesocarp make up the "husk" of the coconut, while the endocarp makes up the hard coconut "shell". Two of the pores are plugged (the "eyes"), while one is functional.

The endocarp is initially filled with a multinucleate liquid endosperm (the coconut water). They eventually form the edible solid endosperm (the "coconut meat" or "coconut flesh") which hardens over time. The small cylindrical embryo is embedded in the solid endosperm directly below the functional pore of the endosperm. During germination, the embryo pushes out of the functional pore and forms a haustorium (the coconut sprout) inside the central cavity. The haustorium absorbs the solid endosperm to nourish the seedling.

Coconut fruits have two distinctive forms depending on domestication. Wild coconuts feature an elongated triangular fruit with a thicker husk and a smaller amount of endosperm. These allow the fruits to be more buoyant and makes it easier for them to lodge into sandy shorelines, making their shape ideal for ocean dispersal.
Domesticated Pacific coconuts, on the other hand, are rounded in shape with a thinner husk and a larger amount of endosperm. Domesticated coconuts also have more amounts of coconut water.
These two forms are referred to by the Samoan terms niu kafa for the elongated wild coconuts, and niu vai for the rounded domesticated Pacific coconuts.

Coconuts sold domestically in coconut-producing countries are typically not de-husked. Especially immature coconuts (6 to 8 months from flowering) sold for coconut water and softer jelly-like coconut meat (known as "green coconuts", "young coconuts", or "water coconuts"), where the original coloration of the fruit is more aesthetically pleasing.

Whole mature coconuts (11 to 13 months from flowering) sold for export, however, typically have the husk removed to reduce weight and volume for transport. This results in the naked coconut "shell" with three pores more familiar in countries where coconuts are not grown locally. In comparison, mature coconuts with the husk intact can be stored for three to five months at normal room temperature .

Roots
Unlike some other plants, the palm tree has neither a taproot nor root hairs, but has a fibrous root system. The root system consists of an abundance of thin roots that grow outward from the plant near the surface. Only a few of the roots penetrate deep into the soil for stability. This type of root system is known as fibrous or adventitious, and is a characteristic of grass species. Other types of large trees produce a single downward-growing tap root with a number of feeder roots growing from it. 2,000–4,000 adventitious roots may grow, each about  large. Decayed roots are replaced regularly as the tree grows new ones.

Inflorescence

The palm produces both the female and male flowers on the same inflorescence; thus, the palm is monoecious. However, there is some evidence that it may be polygamomonoecious and may occasionally have bisexual flowers. The female flower is much larger than the male flower. Flowering occurs continuously. Coconut palms are believed to be largely cross-pollinated, although most dwarf varieties are self-pollinating.

Taxonomy

Phylogeny

The evolutionary history and fossil distribution of Cocos nucifera and other members of the tribe Cocoseae is more ambiguous than modern-day dispersal and distribution, with its ultimate origin and pre-human dispersal still unclear. There are currently two major viewpoints on the origins of the genus Cocos, one in the Indo-Pacific, and another in South America. The vast majority of Cocos-like fossils have been recovered generally from only two regions in the world: New Zealand and west-central India. However, like most palm fossils, Cocos-like fossils are still putative, as they are usually difficult to identify.
The earliest Cocos-like fossil to be found was "Cocos" zeylanica, a fossil species described from small fruits, around  ×  in size, recovered from the Miocene (~23 to 5.3 million years ago) of New Zealand in 1926. Since then, numerous other fossils of similar fruits were recovered throughout New Zealand from the Eocene, Oligocene, and possibly the Holocene. But research on them is still ongoing to determine which of them (if any) actually belong to the genus Cocos. Endt & Hayward (1997) have noted their resemblance to members of the South American genus Parajubaea, rather than Cocos, and propose a South American origin. Conran et al. (2015), however, suggests that their diversity in New Zealand indicate that they evolved endemically, rather than being introduced to the islands by long-distance dispersal. In west-central India, numerous fossils of Cocos-like fruits, leaves, and stems have been recovered from the Deccan Traps. They include morphotaxa like Palmoxylon sundaran, Palmoxylon insignae, and Palmocarpon cocoides. Cocos-like fossils of fruits include "Cocos" intertrappeansis, "Cocos" pantii, and "Cocos" sahnii. They also include fossil fruits that have been tentatively identified as modern Cocos nucifera. These includes two specimens named "Cocos" palaeonucifera and "Cocos" binoriensis, both were dated by their authors to the Maastrichtian–Danian of the early Tertiary (70 to 62 million years ago). C. binoriensis has been claimed by their authors to be the earliest known fossil of Cocos nucifera.

Outside of New Zealand and India, only two other regions have reported Cocos-like fossils, namely Australia and Colombia. Rigby (1995) assigned them to modern Cocos nucifera based on its size. In Colombia, a single Cocos-like fruit was recovered from the middle to late Paleocene Cerrejón Formation. The fruit however was compacted in the fossilization process and it was not possible to determine if it had the diagnostic three pores that characterize members of the tribe Cocoseae. Nevertheless, the authors Gomez-Navarro et al. (2009), assigned it to Cocos based on the size and the ridged shape of the fruit.

Further complicating measures to determine the evolutionary history of Cocos is the genetic diversity present within C. nucifera as well as its relatedness to other palms. Phylogenetic evidence supports the closest relatives of Cocos being either Syagrus or Attalea, both of which are found in South America. However, Cocos is not thought to be indigenous to South America, and the highest genetic diversity is present in Asian Cocos, indicating that at least the modern species Cocos nucifera is native to there. In addition, fossils of potential Cocos ancestors have been recovered from both Colombia and India. In order to resolve this enigma, a 2014 study proposed that the ancestors of Cocos had likely originated on the Caribbean coast of what is now Colombia, and during the Eocene the ancestral Cocos performed a long-distance dispersal across the Atlantic Ocean to North Africa. From here, island-hopping via coral atolls lining the Tethys Sea, potentially boosted by the ocean currents at the time, would have proved crucial to dispersal, eventually allowing ancestral coconuts to reach India. The study contended that an adaptation to coral atolls would explain the prehistoric and modern distributions of Cocos, would have provided the necessary evolutionary pressures, and would account for morphological factors such as a thick husk to protect against ocean degradation and provide a moist medium in which to germinate on sparse atolls.

Etymology 

The name coconut is derived from the 16th-century Portuguese word coco, meaning 'head' or 'skull' after the three indentations on the coconut shell that resemble facial features. Coco and coconut apparently came from 1521 encounters by Portuguese and Spanish explorers with Pacific Islanders, with the coconut shell reminding them of a ghost or witch in Portuguese folklore called coco (also côca). In the West it was originally called nux indica, a name used by Marco Polo in 1280 while in Sumatra. He took the term from the Arabs, who called it جوز هندي jawz hindī, translating to 'Indian nut'. Thenga, its Tamil/Malayalam name, was used in the detailed description of coconut found in Itinerario by Ludovico di Varthema published in 1510 and also in the later Hortus Indicus Malabaricus.

Carl Linnaeus first wanted to name the coconut genus Coccus from latinizing the Portuguese word coco, because he saw works of other botanists in middle of the 17th century use the name as well. He consulted the catalogue Herbarium Amboinense by Georg Eberhard Rumphius where Rumphius said that coccus was a homonym of coccum and coccus from Greek  kokkos meaning "grain" or "berry", but Romans identified coccus with "kermes insects"; Rumphius preferred the word cocus as a replacement. However, the word cocus could also mean "cook" like coquus in Latin, so Linnaeus chose Cocos directly from the Portuguese word coco instead.

The specific name nucifera is derived from the Latin words nux (nut) and fera (bearing), for 'nut-bearing'.

Distribution and habitat

Coconuts have a nearly cosmopolitan distribution due to human cultivation and dispersal. However their original distribution was in the Central Indo-Pacific, in the regions of Maritime Southeast Asia and Melanesia.

Origin

Modern genetic studies have identified the center of origin of coconuts as being the Central Indo-Pacific, the region between western Southeast Asia and Melanesia, where it shows greatest genetic diversity. Their cultivation and spread was closely tied to the early migrations of the Austronesian peoples who carried coconuts as canoe plants to islands they settled. The similarities of the local names in the Austronesian region is also cited as evidence that the plant originated in the region. For example, the Polynesian and Melanesian term niu; Tagalog and Chamorro term niyog; and the Malay word nyiur or nyior. Other evidence for a Central Indo-Pacific origin is the native range of the coconut crab; and the higher amounts of C. nucifera-specific insect pests in the region (90%) in comparison to the Americas (20%), and Africa (4%).

A study in 2011 identified two highly genetically differentiated subpopulations of coconuts, one originating from Island Southeast Asia (the Pacific group) and the other from the southern margins of the Indian subcontinent (the Indo-Atlantic group). The Pacific group is the only one to display clear genetic and phenotypic indications that they were domesticated; including dwarf habit, self-pollination, and the round "niu vai" fruit morphology with larger endosperm-to-husk ratios. The distribution of the Pacific coconuts correspond to the regions settled by Austronesian voyagers indicating that its spread was largely the result of human introductions. It is most strikingly displayed in Madagascar, an island settled by Austronesian sailors at around 2000 to 1500 BP. The coconut populations in the island show genetic admixture between the two subpopulations indicating that Pacific coconuts were brought by the Austronesian settlers that later interbred with the local Indo-Atlantic coconuts.

Genetic studies of coconuts have also confirmed pre-Columbian populations of coconuts in Panama in South America. However, it is not native and displays a genetic bottleneck resulting from a founder effect. A study in 2008 showed that the coconuts in the Americas are genetically closest related to coconuts in the Philippines, and not to any other nearby coconut populations (including Polynesia). Such an origin indicates that the coconuts were not introduced naturally, such as by sea currents. The researchers concluded that it was brought by early Austronesian sailors to the Americas from at least 2,250 BP, and may be proof of pre-Columbian contact between Austronesian cultures and South American cultures. It is further strengthened by other similar botanical evidence of contact, like the pre-colonial presence of sweet potato in Oceanian cultures. During the colonial era, Pacific coconuts were further introduced to Mexico from the Spanish East Indies via the Manila galleons.

In contrast to the Pacific coconuts, Indo-Atlantic coconuts were largely spread by Arab and Persian traders into the East African coast. Indo-Atlantic coconuts were also introduced into the Atlantic Ocean by Portuguese ships from their colonies in coastal India and Sri Lanka; first being introduced to coastal West Africa, then onwards into the Caribbean and the east coast of Brazil. All of these introductions are within the last few centuries, relatively recent in comparison to the spread of Pacific coconuts.

Natural habitat
The coconut palm thrives on sandy soils and is highly tolerant of salinity. It prefers areas with abundant sunlight and regular rainfall ( annually), which makes colonizing shorelines of the tropics relatively straightforward. Coconuts also need high humidity (at least 70–80%) for optimum growth, which is why they are rarely seen in areas with low humidity.

Coconut palms require warm conditions for successful growth, and are intolerant of cold weather. They may grow but not fruit properly in areas with insufficient warmth, such as Bermuda.

The conditions required for coconut trees to grow without any care are:
 Mean daily temperature above  every day of the year
 Mean annual rainfall above 
 No or very little overhead canopy, since even small trees require direct sun

The main limiting factor for most locations which satisfy the rainfall and temperature requirements is canopy growth, except those locations near coastlines, where the sandy soil and salt spray limit the growth of most other trees.

Domestication

Wild coconuts are naturally restricted to coastal areas in sandy, saline soils. The fruit is adapted for ocean dispersal. Coconuts could not reach inland locations without human intervention (to carry seednuts, plant seedlings, etc.) and early germination on the palm (vivipary) was important.

Coconuts today can be grouped into two highly genetically distinct subpopulations: the Indo-Atlantic group originating from southern India and nearby regions (including Sri Lanka, the Laccadives, and the Maldives); and the Pacific group originating from the region between maritime Southeast Asia and Melanesia. Linguistic, archaeological, and genetic evidence all point to the early domestication of Pacific coconuts by the Austronesian peoples in maritime Southeast Asia during the Austronesian expansion (c. 3000 to 1500 BCE). Although archaeological remains dating back to 1000 to 500 BCE also suggest that the Indo-Atlantic coconuts were also later independently cultivated by the Dravidian peoples, only Pacific coconuts show clear signs of domestication traits like dwarf habits, self-pollination, and rounded fruits. Indo-Atlantic coconuts, in contrast, all have the ancestral traits of tall habits and elongated triangular fruits.

The coconut played a critical role in the migrations of the Austronesian peoples. They provided a portable source of both food and water, allowing Austronesians to survive long sea voyages to colonize new islands as well as establish long-range trade routes. Based on linguistic evidence, the absence of words for coconut in the Taiwanese Austronesian languages makes it likely that the Austronesian coconut culture developed only after Austronesians started colonizing the Philippines. The importance of the coconut in Austronesian cultures is evidenced by shared terminology of even very specific parts and uses of coconuts, which were carried outwards from the Philippines during the Austronesian migrations. Indo-Atlantic type coconuts were also later spread by Arab and South Asian traders along the Indian Ocean basin, resulting in limited admixture with Pacific coconuts introduced earlier to Madagascar and the Comoros via the ancient Austronesian maritime trade network.

Coconuts can be broadly divided into two fruit typesthe ancestral niu kafa form with a thick-husked, angular fruit, and the niu vai form with a thin-husked, spherical fruit with a higher proportion of endosperm. The terms are derived from the Samoan language and was adopted into scientific usage by Harries (1978).

The niu kafa form is the wild ancestral type, with thick husks to protect the seed, an angular, highly ridged shape to promote buoyancy during ocean dispersal, and a pointed base that allowed fruits to dig into the sand, preventing them from being washed away during germination on a new island. It is the dominant form in the Indo-Atlantic coconuts. However, they may have also been partially selected for thicker husks for coir production, which was also important in Austronesian material culture as a source for cordage in building houses and boats.

The niu vai form is the domesticated form dominant in the Pacific coconuts. They were selected for by the Austronesian peoples for their larger endosperm-to-husk ratio as well as higher coconut water content, making them more useful as food and water reserves for sea voyages. The decreased buoyancy and increased fragility of this spherical, thin-husked fruit would not matter for a species that had started to be dispersed by humans and grown in plantations. Niu vai endocarp fragments have been recovered in archaeological sites in the St. Matthias Islands of the Bismarck Archipelago. The fragments are dated to approximately 1000 BCE, suggesting that cultivation and artificial selection of coconuts were already practiced by the Austronesian Lapita people.

Coconuts can also be broadly divided into two general types based on habit: the "Tall" (var. typica) and "Dwarf" (var. nana) varieties. The two groups are genetically distinct, with the dwarf variety showing a greater degree of artificial selection for ornamental traits and for early germination and fruiting. The tall variety is outcrossing while dwarf palms are self-pollinating, which has led to a much greater degree of genetic diversity within the tall group.

The dwarf coconut cultivars are fully domesticated, in contrast to tall cultivars which display greater diversity in terms of domestication (and lack thereof). The fact that all dwarf coconuts share three genetic markers out of thirteen (which are only present in low frequencies in tall cultivars) makes it likely that they all originate from a single domesticated population. Philippine and Malayan dwarf coconuts diverged early into two distinct types. They usually remain genetically isolated when introduced to new regions, making it possible to trace their origins. Numerous other dwarf cultivars also developed as the initial dwarf cultivar was introduced to other regions and hybridized with various tall cultivars. The origin of dwarf varieties is Southeast Asia, which contain the tall cultivars that are genetically closest to dwarf coconuts.

Another ancestral variety is the niu leka of Polynesia (sometimes called the "Compact Dwarfs"). Although it shares similar characteristics to dwarf coconuts (including slow growth), it is genetically distinct and is thus believed to be independently domesticated, likely in Tonga. Other cultivars of niu leka may also exist in other islands of the Pacific, and some are probably descendants of advanced crosses between Compact Dwarfs and Southeast Asian Dwarf types.

Dispersal

Coconut fruit in the wild are light, buoyant, and highly water resistant. It is claimed that they evolved to disperse significant distances via marine currents. However, it can also be argued that the placement of the vulnerable eye of the nut (down when floating), and the site of the coir cushion are better positioned to ensure that the water-filled nut does not fracture when dropping on rocky ground, rather than for flotation.

This figure has been questioned based on the extremely small sample size that forms the basis of the paper that makes this claim. Thor Heyerdahl provides an alternative, and much shorter, estimate based on his first-hand experience crossing the Pacific Ocean on the raft Kon-Tiki:
 The nuts we had in baskets on deck remained edible and capable of germinating the whole way to Polynesia. But we had laid about half among the special provisions below deck, with the waves washing around them. Every single one of these was ruined by the sea water. And no coconut can float over the sea faster than a balsa raft moves with the wind behind it.
He also notes that several of the nuts began to germinate by the time they had been ten weeks at sea, precluding an unassisted journey of 100 days or more.

Drift models based on wind and ocean currents have shown that coconuts could not have drifted across the Pacific unaided. If they were naturally distributed and had been in the Pacific for a thousand years or so, then we would expect the eastern shore of Australia, with its own islands sheltered by the Great Barrier Reef, to have been thick with coconut palms: the currents were directly into, and down along this coast. However, both James Cook and William Bligh (put adrift after the Bounty mutiny) found no sign of the nuts along this  stretch when he needed water for his crew. Nor were there coconuts on the east side of the African coast until Vasco da Gama, nor in the Caribbean when first visited by Christopher Columbus. They were commonly carried by Spanish ships as a source of fresh water.

These provide substantial circumstantial evidence that deliberate Austronesian voyagers were involved in carrying coconuts across the Pacific Ocean and that they could not have dispersed worldwide without human agency. More recently, genomic analysis of cultivated coconut (C. nucifera L.) has shed light on the movement. However, admixture, the transfer of genetic material, evidently occurred between the two populations.

Given that coconuts are ideally suited for inter-island group ocean dispersal, obviously some natural distribution did take place. However, the locations of the admixture events are limited to Madagascar and coastal east Africa, and exclude the Seychelles. This pattern coincides with the known trade routes of Austronesian sailors. Additionally, a genetically distinct subpopulation of coconut on the Pacific coast of Latin America has undergone a genetic bottleneck resulting from a founder effect; however, its ancestral population is the Pacific coconut from the Philippines. This, together with their use of the South American sweet potato, suggests that Austronesian peoples may have sailed as far east as the Americas. In the Hawaiian Islands, the coconut is regarded as a Polynesian introduction, first brought to the islands by early Polynesian voyagers (also Austronesians) from their homelands in the southern islands of Polynesia.

Specimens have been collected from the sea as far north as Norway (but it is not known where they entered the water). They have been found in the Caribbean and the Atlantic coasts of Africa and South America for less than 500 years (the Caribbean native inhabitants do not have a dialect term for them, but use the Portuguese name), but evidence of their presence on the Pacific coast of South America antedates Columbus's arrival in the Americas. They are now almost ubiquitous between 26° N and 26° S except for the interiors of Africa and South America.

The 2014 coral atoll origin hypothesis proposed that the coconut had dispersed in an island hopping fashion using the small, sometimes transient, coral atolls. It noted that by using these small atolls, the species could easily island-hop. Over the course of evolutionary time-scales the shifting atolls would have shortened the paths of colonization, meaning that any one coconut would not have to travel very far to find new land.

Ecology 

Coconuts are susceptible to the phytoplasma disease, lethal yellowing. One recently selected cultivar, the 'Maypan', has been bred for resistance to this disease. Yellowing diseases affect plantations in Africa, India, Mexico, the Caribbean and the Pacific Region.

The coconut palm is damaged by the larvae of many Lepidoptera (butterfly and moth) species which feed on it, including the African armyworm (Spodoptera exempta) and Batrachedra spp.: B. arenosella, B. atriloqua (feeds exclusively on C. nucifera), B. mathesoni (feeds exclusively on C. nucifera), and B. nuciferae.

Brontispa longissima (coconut leaf beetle) feeds on young leaves, and damages both seedlings and mature coconut palms. In 2007, the Philippines imposed a quarantine in Metro Manila and 26 provinces to stop the spread of the pest and protect the Philippine coconut industry managed by some 3.5 million farmers.

The fruit may also be damaged by eriophyid coconut mites (Eriophyes guerreronis). This mite infests coconut plantations, and is devastating; it can destroy up to 90% of coconut production. The immature seeds are infested and desapped by larvae staying in the portion covered by the perianth of the immature seed; the seeds then drop off or survive deformed. Spraying with wettable sulfur 0.4% or with Neem-based pesticides can give some relief, but is cumbersome and labor-intensive.

In Kerala, India, the main coconut pests are the coconut mite, the rhinoceros beetle, the red palm weevil, and the coconut leaf caterpillar. Research into countermeasures to these pests has  yielded no results; researchers from the Kerala Agricultural University and the Central Plantation Crop Research Institute, Kasaragode, continue to work on countermeasures. The Krishi Vigyan Kendra, Kannur under Kerala Agricultural University has developed an innovative extension approach called the compact area group approach  to combat coconut mites.

Production and cultivation

In 2020, world production of coconuts was 62 million tonnes, led by Indonesia, India, and the Philippines, with 75% combined of the total (table).

Cultivation
Coconut palms are normally cultivated in hot and wet tropical climates. They need year round warmth and moisture to grow well and fruit. Coconut palms are hard to establish in dry climates, and cannot grow there without frequent irrigation; in drought conditions, the new leaves do not open well, and older leaves may become desiccated; fruit also tends to be shed.

The extent of cultivation in the tropics is threatening a number of habitats, such as mangroves; an example of such damage to an ecoregion is in the Petenes mangroves of the Yucatán.

Cultivars
Coconut has a number of commercial and traditional cultivars. They can be sorted mainly into tall cultivars, dwarf cultivars, and hybrid cultivars (hybrids between talls and dwarfs). Some of the dwarf cultivars such as 'Malayan dwarf' have shown some promising resistance to lethal yellowing, while other cultivars such as 'Jamaican tall' are highly affected by the same plant disease. Some cultivars are more drought resistant such as 'West coast tall' (India) while others such as 'Hainan Tall' (China) are more cold tolerant. Other aspects such as seed size, shape and weight, and copra thickness are also important factors in the selection of new cultivars. Some cultivars such as 'Fiji dwarf' form a large bulb at the lower stem and others are cultivated to produce very sweet coconut water with orange-colored husks (king coconut) used entirely in fruit stalls for drinking (Sri Lanka, India).

Harvesting

The two most common harvesting methods are the climbing method and the pole method. Climbing is the most widespread, but it is also more dangerous and requires skilled workers. Manually climbing trees is traditional in most countries and requires a specific posture that exerts pressure on the trunk with the feet. Climbers employed in coconut plantations often develop musculoskeletal disorders and risk severe injury or death from falling.

To avoid this, coconuts workers in the Philippines and Guam traditionally use bolos tied with a rope to the waist to cut grooves at regular intervals on the coconut trunks. This basically turns the trunk of the tree into a ladder, though it reduces the value of coconut timber recovered from the trees and can be an entry point for infection. Other manual methods to make climbing easier include using a system of pulleys and ropes; using pieces of vine, rope, or cloth tied to both hands or feet; using spikes attached to the feet or legs; or attaching coconut husks to the trunk with ropes. Modern methods use hydraulic elevators mounted on tractors or ladders. Mechanical coconut climbing devices and even automated robots have also been recently developed in countries like India, Sri Lanka, and Malaysia.

The pole method uses a long pole with a cutting device at the end. In the Philippines, the traditional tool is known as the halabas and is made from a long bamboo pole with a sickle-like blade mounted at the tip. Though safer and faster than the climbing method, its main disadvantage is that it does not allow workers to examine and clean the crown of coconuts for pests and diseases.

Determining whether to harvest is also important. Gatchalian et al 1994 developed a sonometry technique for precisely determining the stage of ripeness of young coconuts.

A system of bamboo bridges and ladders directly connecting the tree canopies are also utilized in the Philippines for coconut plantations that harvest coconut sap (not fruits) for coconut vinegar and palm wine production. In other areas, like in Papua New Guinea, coconuts are simply collected when they fall to the ground.

A more controversial method employed by a small number of coconut farmers in Thailand and Malaysia use trained pig-tailed macaques to harvest coconuts. Thailand has been raising and training pig-tailed macaques to pick coconuts for around 400 years. Training schools for pig-tailed macaques still exist both in southern Thailand and in the Malaysian state of Kelantan.

The practice of using macaques to harvest coconuts was exposed in Thailand by the People for the Ethical Treatment of Animals (PETA) in 2019, resulting in calls for boycotts on coconut products. PETA later clarified that the use of macaques is not practiced in the Philippines, India, Brazil, Colombia, Hawaii, and other major coconut-producing regions.

Substitutes for cooler climates

In cooler climates (but not less than USDA Zone 9), a similar palm, the queen palm (Syagrus romanzoffiana), is used in landscaping. Its fruits are similar to the coconut, but smaller. The queen palm was originally classified in the genus Cocos along with the coconut, but was later reclassified in Syagrus. A recently discovered palm, Beccariophoenix alfredii from Madagascar, is nearly identical to the coconut, more so than the queen palm and can also be grown in slightly cooler climates than the coconut palm. Coconuts can only be grown in temperatures above  and need a daily temperature above  to produce fruit.

Production by country

Indonesia
Indonesia is the world's largest producer of coconuts, with gross production of 15 million tonnes. A sprouting coconut seed is the logo for Gerakan Pramuka Indonesia, the Indonesian scouting organization.

Philippines

The Philippines is the world's second-largest producer of coconuts. It was the world's largest producer for decades until a decline in production due to aging trees as well as typhoon devastation. Indonesia overtook it in 2010. It is still the largest producer of coconut oil and copra, accounting for 64% of the global production. The production of coconuts plays an important role in the economy, with 25% of cultivated land (around 3.56 million hectares) used for coconut plantations and approximately 25 to 33% of the population reliant on coconuts for their livelihood.

Two important coconut products were first developed in the Philippines, macapuno and nata de coco. Macapuno is a coconut variety with a jelly-like coconut meat. Its meat is sweetened, cut into strands, and sold in glass jars as coconut strings, sometimes labeled as "coconut sport". Nata de coco, also called coconut gel, is another jelly-like coconut product made from fermented coconut water.

India

Traditional areas of coconut cultivation in India are the states of Kerala, Tamil Nadu, Karnataka, Puducherry, Andhra Pradesh, Goa, Maharashtra, Odisha, West Bengal and, Gujarat and the islands of Lakshadweep and Andaman and Nicobar. As per 2014–15 statistics from Coconut Development Board of Government of India, four southern states combined account for almost 90% of the total production in the country: Tamil Nadu (33.8%), Karnataka (25.2%), Kerala (24.0%), and Andhra Pradesh (7.2%). Other states, such as Goa, Maharashtra, Odisha, West Bengal, and those in the northeast (Tripura and Assam) account for the remaining productions. Though Kerala has the largest number of coconut trees, in terms of production per hectare, Tamil Nadu leads all other states. In Tamil Nadu, Coimbatore and Tirupur regions top the production list.

In Goa, the coconut tree has been reclassified by the government as a palm (rather than a tree), enabling farmers and developers to clear land with fewer restrictions and without needing permission from the forest department before cutting a coconut tree.

Middle East
The main coconut-producing area in the Middle East is the Dhofar region of Oman, but they can be grown all along the Persian Gulf, Arabian Sea, and Red Sea coasts, because these seas are tropical and provide enough humidity (through seawater evaporation) for coconut trees to grow. The young coconut plants need to be nursed and irrigated with drip pipes until they are old enough (stem bulb development) to be irrigated with brackish water or seawater alone, after which they can be replanted on the beaches. In particular, the area around Salalah maintains large coconut plantations similar to those found across the Arabian Sea in Kerala. The reasons why coconut are cultivated only in Yemen's Al Mahrah and Hadramaut governorates and in the Sultanate of Oman, but not in other suitable areas in the Arabian Peninsula, may originate from the fact that Oman and Hadramaut had long dhow trade relations with Burma, Malaysia, Indonesia, East Africa, and Zanzibar, as well as southern India and China. Omani people needed the coir rope from the coconut fiber to stitch together their traditional seagoing dhow vessels in which nails were never used. The know-how of coconut cultivation and necessary soil fixation and irrigation may have found its way into Omani, Hadrami and Al-Mahra culture by people who returned from those overseas areas.

The ancient coconut groves of Dhofar were mentioned by the medieval Moroccan traveller Ibn Battuta in his writings, known as Al Rihla. The annual rainy season known locally as khareef or monsoon makes coconut cultivation easy on the Arabian east coast.

Coconut trees also are increasingly grown for decorative purposes along the coasts of the United Arab Emirates and Saudi Arabia with the help of irrigation. The UAE has, however, imposed strict laws on mature coconut tree imports from other countries to reduce the spread of pests to other native palm trees, as the mixing of date and coconut trees poses a risk of cross-species palm pests, such as rhinoceros beetles and red palm weevils. The artificial landscaping may have been the cause for lethal yellowing, a viral coconut palm disease that leads to the death of the tree. It is spread by host insects, that thrive on heavy turf grasses. Therefore, heavy turf grass environments (beach resorts and golf courses) also pose a major threat to local coconut trees. Traditionally, dessert banana plants and local wild beach flora such as Scaevola taccada and Ipomoea pes-caprae were used as humidity-supplying green undergrowth for coconut trees, mixed with sea almond and sea hibiscus. Due to growing sedentary lifestyles and heavy-handed landscaping, a decline in these traditional farming and soil-fixing techniques has occurred.

Sri Lanka 
Sri Lanka is the world's fourth-largest producer of coconuts and is the second-largest producer of coconut oil and copra, accounting for 15% of the global production. The production of coconuts is the main source of Sri Lanka economy, with 12% of cultivated land and 409,244 hectares used for coconut growing (2017). Sri Lanka established its Coconut Development Authority and Coconut Cultivation Board and Coconut Research Institute in the early British Ceylon period.

United States
In the United States, coconut palms can be grown and reproduced outdoors without irrigation in Hawaii, southern and central Florida, and the territories of Puerto Rico, Guam, American Samoa, the U.S. Virgin Islands, and the Northern Mariana Islands.

In Florida, wild populations of coconut palms extend up the East Coast from Key West to Jupiter Inlet, and up the West Coast from Marco Island to Sarasota. Many of the smallest coral islands in the Florida Keys are known to have abundant coconut palms sprouting from coconuts that have drifted or been deposited by ocean currents. Coconut palms are cultivated north of south Florida to roughly Cocoa Beach on the East Coast and Clearwater on the West Coast.

Australia
Coconuts are commonly grown around the northern coast of Australia, and in some warmer parts of New South Wales. However they are mainly present as decoration, and the Australian coconut industry is small; Australia is a net importer of coconut products. Australian cities put much effort into de-fruiting decorative coconut trees to ensure that the mature coconuts do not fall and injure people.

Allergens

Food 
Coconut oil is increasingly used in the food industry. Proteins from coconut may cause food allergy, including anaphylaxis.

In the United States, the Food and Drug Administration declared that coconut must be disclosed as an ingredient on package labels as a "tree nut" with potential allergenicity.

Topical 
Cocamidopropyl betaine (CAPB) is a surfactant manufactured from coconut oil that is increasingly used as an ingredient in personal hygiene products and cosmetics, such as shampoos, liquid soaps, cleansers and antiseptics, among others. CAPB may cause mild skin irritation, but allergic reactions to CAPB are rare and probably related to impurities rendered during the manufacturing process (which include amidoamine and dimethylaminopropylamine) rather than CAPB itself.

Uses 

The coconut palm is grown throughout the tropics for decoration, as well as for its many culinary and nonculinary uses; virtually every part of the coconut palm can be used by humans in some manner and has significant economic value. Coconuts' versatility is sometimes noted in its naming. In Sanskrit, it is kalpa vriksha ("the tree which provides all the necessities of life"). In the Malay language, it is pokok seribu guna ("the tree of a thousand uses"). In the Philippines, the coconut is commonly called the "tree of life".

It is one of the most useful trees in the world.

Culinary uses

Nutrition

A  reference serving of raw coconut flesh supplies  of food energy and a high amount of total fat (33 grams), especially saturated fat (89% of total fat), along with a moderate quantity of carbohydrates (15 g), and protein (3 g). Micronutrients in significant content (more than 10% of the Daily Value) include the dietary minerals, manganese, copper, iron, phosphorus, selenium, and zinc (table).
The various parts of the coconut have a number of culinary uses.

Coconut meat

The edible white, fleshy part of the seed (the endosperm) is known as the "coconut meat", "coconut flesh", or "coconut kernel." In the coconut industry, coconut meat can be classified loosely into three different types depending on maturitynamely "Malauhog", "Malakanin" and "Malakatad". The terminology is derived from the Tagalog language. Malauhog (literally "mucus-like") refers to very young coconut meat (around 6 to 7 months old) which has a translucent appearance and a gooey texture that disintegrates easily. Malakanin (literally "cooked rice-like") refers to young coconut meat (around 7–8 months old) which has a more opaque white appearance, a soft texture similar to cooked rice, and can still be easily scraped off the coconut shell. Malakatad (literally "leather-like") refers to fully mature coconut meat (around 8 to 9 months old) with an opaque white appearance, a tough rubbery to leathery texture, and is difficult to separate from the shell.

Maturity is difficult to assess on an unopened coconut, and there is no technically proven method for determining maturity. Based on color and size, younger coconuts tend to be smaller and have brighter colors, while more mature coconuts have browner colors and are larger. They can also be determined traditionally by tapping on the coconut fruit. Malauhog has a "solid" sound when tapped, while Malakanin and Malakatad produce a "hollow" sound. Another method is to shake the coconut. Immature coconuts produce a sloshing sound when shaken (the sharper the sound, the younger it is), while fully mature coconuts do not.

Both Malauhog and Malakanin coconut meat of immature fruits can be eaten as is or used in salads, drinks, desserts, and pastries such as buko pie and es kelapa muda. Because of their soft textures, they are unsuitable for grating. Mature Malakatad coconut meat has a tough texture and thus are processed before consumption or made into copra. Freshly shredded mature coconut meat, known as "grated coconut", "shredded coconut", or "coconut flakes", is used in the extraction of coconut milk. They are also used as a garnish for various dishes, as in klepon and puto bumbong. They can also be cooked in sugar and eaten as a dessert in the Philippines known as bukayo.

Grated coconut that is dehydrated by drying or baking is known as "desiccated coconut." It contains less than 3% of the original moisture content of coconut meat. It is predominantly used in the bakery and confectionary industries (especially in non-coconut-producing countries) because of its longer shelf life compared to freshly grated coconut. Desiccated coconut are used in confections and desserts such as macaroons. Dried coconut is also used as the filling for many chocolate bars. Some dried coconut is purely coconut, but others are manufactured with other ingredients, such as sugar, propylene glycol, salt, and sodium metabisulfite.

Coconut meat can also be cut into larger pieces or strips, dried, and salted to make "coconut chips" or "coco chips". These can be toasted or baked to make bacon-like fixings.

Macapuno
A special cultivar of coconut known as macapuno produces a large amount of jelly-like coconut meat. Its meat fills the entire interior of the coconut shell, rather than just the inner surfaces. It was first developed for commercial cultivation in the Philippines and is used widely in Philippine cuisine for desserts, drinks, and pastries. It is also popular in Indonesia (where it is known as kopyor) for making beverages.

Coconut milk

Coconut milk, not to be confused with coconut water, is obtained by pressing the grated coconut meat, usually with hot water added which extracts the coconut oil, proteins, and aromatic compounds. It is used for cooking various dishes. Coconut milk contains 5% to 20% fat, while coconut cream contains around 20% to 50% fat. Most of the fat is saturated (89%), with lauric acid being the major fatty acid. Coconut milk can be diluted to create coconut milk beverages. These have much lower fat content and are suitable as milk substitutes.

Coconut milk powder, a protein-rich powder can be processed from coconut milk following centrifugation, separation, and spray drying.

Coconut milk and coconut cream extracted from grated coconut is frequently added to various dessert and savory dishes, as well as in curries and stews. It can also be diluted into a beverage. Various other products made from thickened coconut milk with sugar and/or eggs like coconut jam and coconut custard are also widespread in Southeast Asia. In the Philippines, sweetened reduced coconut milk is marketed as coconut syrup and is used for various desserts. Coconut oil extracted from coconut milk or copra is also used for frying, cooking, and making margarine, among other uses.

Coconut water

Coconut water serves as a suspension for the endosperm of the coconut during its nuclear phase of development. Later, the endosperm matures and deposits onto the coconut rind during the cellular phase. It is consumed throughout the humid tropics, and has been introduced into the retail market as a processed sports drink. Mature fruits have significantly less liquid than young, immature coconuts, barring spoilage. Coconut water can be fermented to produce coconut vinegar.

Per 100-gram serving, coconut water contains 19 calories and no significant content of essential nutrients.

Coconut water can be drunk fresh or used in cooking as in binakol. It can also be fermented to produce a jelly-like dessert known as nata de coco.

Coconut flour
Coconut flour has also been developed for use in baking, to combat malnutrition.

Sprouted coconut

Newly germinated coconuts contain a spherical edible mass known as the sprouted coconut or coconut sprout. It has a crunchy watery texture and a slightly sweet taste. It is eaten as is or used as an ingredient in various dishes. It is produced as the endosperm nourishes the developing embryo. It is a haustorium, a spongy absorbent tissue formed from the distal portion of embryo during coconut germination, facilitates absorption of nutrients for the growing shoot and root.

Heart of palm

Apical buds of adult plants are edible, and are known as "palm cabbage" or heart of palm. They are considered a rare delicacy, as harvesting the buds kills the palms. Hearts of palm are eaten in salads, sometimes called "millionaire's salad".

Toddy and sap

The sap derived from incising the flower clusters of the coconut is drunk as toddy, also known as tubâ in the Philippines (both fermented and fresh), tuak (Indonesia and Malaysia), karewe (fresh and not fermented, collected twice a day, for breakfast and dinner) in Kiribati, and neera in South Asia. When left to ferment on its own, it becomes palm wine. Palm wine is distilled to produce arrack. In the Philippines, this alcoholic drink is called lambanog (historically also called vino de coco in Spanish) or "coconut vodka".

The sap can be reduced by boiling to create a sweet syrup or candy such as te kamamai in Kiribati or dhiyaa hakuru and addu bondi in the Maldives. It can be reduced further to yield coconut sugar also referred to as palm sugar or jaggery.

Coconut sap, usually extracted from cut inflorescence stalks is sweet when fresh and can be drunk as is such as in tuba fresca of Mexico (derived from the Philippine tubâ). They can also be processed to extract palm sugar. The sap when fermented can also be made into coconut vinegar or various palm wines (which can be further distilled to make arrack).

Coconut vinegar

Coconut vinegar, made from fermented coconut water or sap, is used extensively in Southeast Asian cuisine (notably the Philippines, where it is known as sukang tuba), as well as in some cuisines of India and Sri Lanka, especially Goan cuisine. A cloudy white liquid, it has a particularly sharp, acidic taste with a slightly yeasty note.

Coconut oil

Coconut oil is commonly used in cooking, especially for frying. It can be used in liquid form as would other vegetable oils, or in solid form similar to butter or lard.

Long-term consumption of coconut oil may have negative health effects similar to those from consuming other sources of saturated fats, including butter, beef fat, and palm oil. Its chronic consumption may increase the risk of cardiovascular diseases by raising total blood cholesterol levels through elevated blood levels of LDL cholesterol and lauric acid.

Coconut butter
Coconut butter is often used to describe solidified coconut oil, but has also been adopted as an alternate name for creamed coconut, a specialty product made of coconut milk solids or puréed coconut meat and oil.

Copra

Copra is the dried meat of the seed and after processing produces coconut oil and coconut meal. Coconut oil, aside from being used in cooking as an ingredient and for frying, is used in soaps, cosmetics, hair oil, and massage oil. Coconut oil is also a main ingredient in Ayurvedic oils.

It takes around 6,000 full-grown coconuts to produce one tonne of copra.

Husks and shells

The husk and shells can be used for fuel and are a source of charcoal. Activated carbon manufactured from coconut shell is considered extremely effective for the removal of impurities. The coconut's obscure origin in foreign lands led to the notion of using cups made from the shell to neutralise poisoned drinks. The cups were frequently engraved and decorated with precious metals.

The husks can be used as flotation devices. As an abrasive, a dried half coconut shell with husk can be used to buff floors. It is known as a bunot in the Philippines and simply a "coconut brush" in Jamaica. The fresh husk of a brown coconut may serve as a dish sponge or body sponge. A coco chocolatero was a cup used to serve small quantities of beverages (such as chocolate drinks) between the 17th and 19th centuries in countries such as Mexico, Guatemala, and Venezuela.

In Asia, coconut shells are also used as bowls and in the manufacture of various handicrafts, including buttons carved from dried shell. Coconut buttons are often used for Hawaiian aloha shirts. Tempurung, as the shell is called in the Malay language, can be used as a soup bowl andif fixed with a handlea ladle. In Thailand, the coconut husk is used as a potting medium to produce healthy forest tree saplings. The process of husk extraction from the coir bypasses the retting process, using a custom-built coconut husk extractor designed by ASEAN–Canada Forest Tree Seed Centre in 1986. Fresh husks contain more tannin than old husks. Tannin produces negative effects on sapling growth. The shell and husk can be burned for smoke to repel mosquitoes and are used in parts of South India for this purpose.

Half coconut shells are used in theatre Foley sound effects work, struck together to create the sound effect of a horse's hoofbeats. Dried half shells are used as the bodies of musical instruments, including the Chinese yehu and banhu, along with the Vietnamese đàn gáo and Arabo-Turkic rebab. In the Philippines, dried half shells are also used as a music instrument in a folk dance called maglalatik.

The shell, freed from the husk, and heated on warm ashes, exudes an oily material that is used to soothe dental pains in traditional medicine of Cambodia.

In World War II, coastwatcher scout Biuku Gasa was the first of two from the Solomon Islands to reach the shipwrecked and wounded crew of Motor Torpedo Boat PT-109 commanded by future U.S. president John F. Kennedy. Gasa suggested, for lack of paper, delivering by dugout canoe a message inscribed on a husked coconut shell, reading “Nauru Isl commander / native knows posit / he can pilot / 11 alive need small boat / Kennedy.” This coconut was later kept on the president's desk, and is now in the John F. Kennedy Library.

Coir 
Coir (the fiber from the husk of the coconut) is used in ropes, mats, doormats, brushes, and sacks, as caulking for boats, and as stuffing fiber for mattresses. It is used in horticulture in potting compost, especially in orchid mix. The coir is used to make brooms in Cambodia.

Leaves

The stiff midribs of coconut leaves are used for making brooms in India, Indonesia (sapu lidi), Malaysia, the Maldives, and the Philippines (walis tingting). The green of the leaves (lamina) is stripped away, leaving the veins (long, thin, woodlike strips) which are tied together to form a broom or brush. A long handle made from some other wood may be inserted into the base of the bundle and used as a two-handed broom.

The leaves also provide material for baskets that can draw well water and for roofing thatch; they can be woven into mats, cooking skewers, and kindling arrows as well. Leaves are also woven into small piuches that are filled with rice and cooked to make pusô and ketupat.

Dried coconut leaves can be burned to ash, which can be harvested for lime. In India, the woven coconut leaves are used to build wedding marquees, especially in the states of Kerala, Karnataka, and Tamil Nadu.

The leaves are used for thatching houses, or for decorating climbing frames and meeting rooms in Cambodia, where the plant is known as dôô:ng.

Timber

Coconut trunks are used for building small bridges and huts; they are preferred for their straightness, strength, and salt resistance. In Kerala, coconut trunks are used for house construction. Coconut timber comes from the trunk, and is increasingly being used as an ecologically sound substitute for endangered hardwoods. It has applications in furniture and specialized construction, as notably demonstrated in Manila's Coconut Palace.

Hawaiians hollowed the trunk to form drums, containers, or small canoes. The "branches" (leaf petioles) are strong and flexible enough to make a switch. The use of coconut branches in corporal punishment was revived in the Gilbertese community on Choiseul in the Solomon Islands in 2005.

Roots
The roots are used as a dye, a mouthwash, and a folk medicine for diarrhea and dysentery. A frayed piece of root can also be used as a toothbrush. In Cambodia, the roots are used in traditional medicine as a treatment for dysentery.

Other uses

The leftover fiber from coconut oil and coconut milk production, coconut meal, is used as livestock feed. The dried calyx is used as fuel in wood-fired stoves. Coconut water is traditionally used as a growth supplement in plant tissue culture and micropropagation. The smell of coconuts comes from the 6-pentyloxan-2-one molecule, known as δ-decalactone in the food and fragrance industries.

Tool and shelter for animals
Researchers from the Melbourne Museum in Australia observed the octopus species Amphioctopus marginatus use tools, specifically coconut shells, for defense and shelter. The discovery of this behavior was observed in Bali and North Sulawesi in Indonesia between 1998 and 2008. Amphioctopus marginatus is the first invertebrate known to be able to use tools.

A coconut can be hollowed out and used as a home for a rodent or small birds. Halved, drained coconuts can also be hung up as bird feeders, and after the flesh has gone, can be filled with fat in winter to attract tits.

In culture

The coconut was a critical food item for the people of Polynesia, and the Polynesians brought it with them as they spread to new islands.

In the Ilocos region of the northern Philippines, the Ilocano people fill two halved coconut shells with diket (cooked sweet rice), and place liningta nga itlog (halved boiled egg) on top of it. This ritual, known as niniyogan, is an offering made to the deceased and one's ancestors. This accompanies the palagip (prayer to the dead).

A coconut is an essential element of rituals in Hindu tradition. Often it is decorated with bright metal foils and other symbols of auspiciousness. It is offered during worship to a Hindu god or goddess. Narali Purnima is celebrated on a full moon day which usually signifies the end of monsoon season in India. The word Narali is derived from naral implying "coconut" in Marathi. Fishermen give an offering of coconut to the sea to celebrate the beginning of a new fishing season. Irrespective of their religious affiliations, fishermen of India often offer it to the rivers and seas in the hopes of having bountiful catches. Hindus often initiate the beginning of any new activity by breaking a coconut to ensure the blessings of the gods and successful completion of the activity. The Hindu goddess of well-being and wealth, Lakshmi, is often shown holding a coconut. In the foothills of the temple town of Palani, before going to worship Murugan for the Ganesha, coconuts are broken at a place marked for the purpose. Every day, thousands of coconuts are broken, and some devotees break as many as 108 coconuts at a time as per the prayer. They are also used in Hindu weddings as a symbol of prosperity.

The flowers are used sometimes in wedding ceremonies in Cambodia.

The Zulu Social Aid and Pleasure Club of New Orleans traditionally throws hand-decorated coconuts, one of the most valuable Mardi Gras souvenirs, to parade revelers. The tradition began in the 1910s, and has continued since. In 1987, a "coconut law" was signed by Governor Edwin Edwards exempting from insurance liability any decorated coconut "handed" from a Zulu float.

The coconut is also used as a target and prize in the traditional British fairground game coconut shy. The player buys some small balls which are then thrown as hard as possible at coconuts balanced on sticks. The aim is to knock a coconut off the stand and win it.

It was the main food of adherents of the now discontinued Vietnamese religion Đạo Dừa.

Myths and legends
Some South Asian, Southeast Asian, and Pacific Ocean cultures have origin myths in which the coconut plays the main role. In the Hainuwele myth from Maluku, a girl emerges from the blossom of a coconut tree. In Maldivian folklore, one of the main myths of origin reflects the dependence of the Maldivians on the coconut tree. In the story of Sina and the Eel, the origin of the coconut is related as the beautiful woman Sina burying an eel, which eventually became the first coconut.

According to urban legend, more deaths are caused by falling coconuts than by sharks annually.

Historical records 
Literary evidence from the Ramayana and Sri Lankan chronicles indicates that the coconut was present in the Indian subcontinent before the 1st century BCE. The earliest direct description is given by Cosmas Indicopleustes in his Topographia Christiana written around 545, referred to as "the great nut of India". Another early mention of the coconut dates back to the "One Thousand and One Nights" story of Sinbad the Sailor wherein he bought and sold a coconut during his fifth voyage.

In March 1521, a description of the coconut was given by Antonio Pigafetta writing in Italian and using the words "cocho"/"cochi", as recorded in his journal after the first European crossing of the Pacific Ocean during the Magellan circumnavigation and meeting the inhabitants of what would become known as Guam and the Philippines. He explained how at Guam "they eat coconuts" ("mangiano cochi") and that the natives there also "anoint the body and the hair with coconut and beniseed oil" ("ongieno el corpo et li capili co oleo de cocho et de giongioli").

See also

 Domesticated plants and animals of Austronesia
 Central Plantation Crops Research Institute
 Coconut production in Kerala
 Coir Board of India
 List of coconut dishes
 List of dishes made using coconut milk
 Ravanahatha  a musical instrument sometimes made of coconuts
 Voanioala gerardii  forest coconut, the closest relative of the modern coconut

References

Sources

Further reading
 Adkins S.W., M. Foale and Y.M.S. Samosir (eds.) (2006). Coconut revival – new possibilities for the 'tree of life'. Proceedings of the International Coconut Forum held in Cairns, Australia, November 22–24, 2005. ACIAR Proceedings No. 125. 
 
 Frison, E.A.; Putter, C.A.J.; Diekmann, M. (eds.). (1993). Coconut . .
 International Plant Genetic Resources Institute (IPGRI). (1995). Descriptors for Coconut (Cocos nucifera L.). .
 Mathur, P.N.; Muralidharan, K.; Parthasarathy, V.A.; Batugal, P.; Bonnot, F. (2008). Data Analysis Manual for Coconut Researchers . .
 Salunkhe, D.K., J.K. Chavan, R.N. Adsule, and S.S. Kadam. (1992). World Oilseeds – Chemistry, Technology, and Utilization. Springer. .

External links

 
Edible palms
Flora of the Maldives
Flora of the Tubuai Islands
Fruits originating in Asia
Garden plants of Asia
Garden plants of Central America
Halophytes
Afrotropical realm flora
Australasian realm flora
Indomalayan realm flora
Oceanian realm flora
Medicinal plants
Non-timber forest products
Ornamental trees
Plants described in 1753
Trees of Belize
Trees of Haiti
Trees of the Dominican Republic
Flora of India (region)
Trees of Indo-China
Trees of Malesia
Trees of Pakistan
Trees of the Caribbean
Trees of the Pacific
Tropical agriculture
Tropical fruit
Crops
Extant Eocene first appearances
Pre-Columbian trans-oceanic contact
Oil seeds
Drupes
Fruit trees
Plant dyes
Flora without expected TNC conservation status